Galore is a rural community in the central east part of the Riverina. It is situated by road, about 22 kilometres north west of Collingullie and 28 kilometres south east of Sandigo. At the 2016 census, Galore had a population of 95 people.

Galore Post Office opened on 1 June 1933.

Notes and references

Towns in the Riverina
Towns in New South Wales